Scott White may refer to:

Scott White (politician) (1970–2011), Democratic member of the Washington State Senate
Scott White (director), American television director and producer
Scott White (ice hockey) (born 1968), Canadian ice hockey executive
Scott White (singer), member of the UK boyband The Reason 4
Scott R. White (1963–2018), American engineer

See also
 Scott Whyte (born 1978), American actor
Scott & White, namely Doctors Arthur C. Scott and Raleigh R. White, Jr., medical doctors of hospital projects
Scott & White Memorial Hospital, hospital and primary clinical teaching campus of Texas A&M Health Science Center College of Medicine
Scott & White Sleep Disorders Center, modern center of research into sleep disorders in Temple, Texas